GX-1 may refer to:
Yamaha GX-1, musical instrument
Panasonic Lumix DMC-GX1, camera model
GX-1 (bus)